The San Miguel Academy is a private Catholic high school institution located in Masantol, Pampanga, Philippines.  Founded in 1946, the school was established by prominent citizens of the town in order to provide quality education to young people who completed their primary education. The name of the school is in honor of the Archangel Michael.

School Paper

The Ang Tinig (The Voice) is the official publication of the school.  It is published every quarter and it contains articles written by both the Faculty and the Campus Journalists.

Faculty Members
Millisa Anciete
Marilou Alfonso
Mary Anne Bargamento
Jennifer Tanqueco
Jona Borlagdan
Trishia Bustos
Junnie Lansangan
Ashley Flores
Ronald Flores
Ronald Francis Viray
Elvy Guerero
Abraham Jimenez
Allan Dennis Bustos
Che Bustos

Principal: Archie N. Yabut
Junior High School Asst. Principal: Elvy Guerrero
Senior High School Asst. Principal: Patricia Flores

Mister and Miss SMA titleholders

Mr.SMA 2017:Aaron Daile Bonifacio
Miss SMA 2017:Aridne Nicole Bonifacio
Mr. Foundation 2017:John Mark Torres
Miss Foundation 2017:Bianca Camille Cayanan

Mr.SMA 2016:Leonard Macapagal
Miss SMA 2016:Lea Kate Flores
Mr. Foundation 2016: Christian Sunga
Miss Foundation 2016: Jandrazzey Charm Lacap

Mr.SMA 2015:Lancelot Lacap
Miss SMA 2015:---
Mr. Foundation 2015:-----
Miss Foundation 2015:----

Miss SMA 1995: Mary Jewelyn R. Bustos

Faculty Members
Millisa Anciete
Marilou Alfonso
Mary Anne Bargamento
Jennifer Tanqueco
Jona Borlagdan
Trishia Bustos
Junnie Lansangan
Ashley Flores
Ronald Flores
Ronald Francis Viray
Elvy Guerero
Abraham Jimenez
Allan Dennis Bustos
Che Bustos

Principal: Archie N. Yabut
Asstnt. Principal: Patricia Flores

Mister and Miss SMA titleholders

Mr.SMA 2017:Aaron Daile Bonifacio
Miss SMA 2017:Aridne Nicole Bonifacio
Mr. Foundation 2017:John Mark Torres
Miss Foundation 2017:---

Mr.SMA 2016:Leonard Macapagal
Miss SMA 2016:Lea Kate Flores
Mr. Foundation 2016: Christian Sunga
Miss Foundation 2016: Jandrazzey Charm Lacap

Mr.SMA 2015:Lancelot Lacap
Miss SMA 2015:---
Mr.Foundation 2015:-----
Miss Foundation 2015:----

References

Schools in Pampanga
Catholic secondary schools in the Philippines
Catholic elementary schools in the Philippines